RybB is a small non-coding RNA was identified in a large scale screen of Escherichia coli. The function of this short RNA has been studied using a transcriptomic approach and kinetic analyses of target mRNA decay in vivo. RybB was identified as a factor that selectively accelerates the decay of multiple major omp mRNAs upon induction of the envelope stress response. This RNA has been shown to bind to the Hfq protein.

In Salmonella, direct interactions for RybB with the following targets have been verified experimentally: STM2391 (fadL), STM1070 (ompA), STM2267 (ompC), STM1572 (ompD), STM0999 (ompF), STM1473 (ompN), STM1995 (ompS), STM1732 (ompW), STM0413 (tsx), STM0687 (ybfM, chiP) and STM1530.

In Escherichia coli, direct interactions for RybB with the following targets have been verified experimentally: b0805 (fiu), b0721 (sdhC), b2215 (ompC), b1256 (ompW), b2594 (rluD) and b0081 (mraZ).

See also
RyfA RNA
RydB RNA
RydC RNA
MicA RNA

References

External links
 

Non-coding RNA